The University of Algarve (UAlg), founded in 1979, is a Portuguese public higher education institution located in the southernmost region of mainland Portugal, the Algarve, having its headquarters and two out of its three campuses in Faro (namely the Gambelas and Penha) and another campus in Portimão.

History 
Founded on 16 January 1979 when its foundation was voted in the Portuguese Parliament, the University of Algarve results from the union of two preexisting institutions, the University of Algarve (created by Law number 11/79 from 28 March 1979) and the Polytechnic Institute of Faro (created by Law 513-T/79 from 26 December 1979), which makes it somewhat different from most universities given that colleges and schools (university faculdades and polytechnic escolas superiores) of both systems, co-exist, and it was also the only Portuguese university created by law. In 1982, the first rector of the university, Gomes Guerreiro (1982-1986) was appointed, followed by Lloyd Braga (1986-1990), Montalvão Marques (1990-1993), Alte da Veiga (1993-1997), Adriano Pimpão (1998-2006), João Guerreiro (2006-2013), António Branco, rector since 2013, followed by Paulo Águas. Following the approval of the Universities Autonomy Law, the Assembly of the University of the Algarve, comprising the representatives of academic and administrative staff and students of all the faculties and schools, approved the Statutes in 1991, which received approval by the Ministry of Education. In 2001, the first University Statute amendment was published in the Portuguese government official gazette. Since its foundation to the 2010s, the university witnessed a significant growth in terms of student population, modern facilities and the quality and diversity of programs on offer. The medical school of the state funded University of Algarve opened its doors to its first 32 new students in September 2009.

Mission, vision and purpose 
The mission of the University of Algarve is to build and nurture a community that advocates and creates market-oriented, value creation-focused opportunities for the academic excellence, professional growth, and advancement of faculty, staff, students, alumni, and the community at large. The university student population is close to 9,000 and operates over 40 graduate and 68 postgraduate programs (approximately 52 MSc and 16 PhD), counting with around 700 permanent teaching and research staff that developed a significant number of research projects and intellectual property, enhanced also by both the research work produced by more than 120 fellowship grant holders focused on R&D&I and the university business incubator which is a source for entrepreneurial business assistance and seed funding for the development of startup companies. UAlg receives international students from more than 70 countries totaling over 18% of its student population. The quality and diversity of European masters and doctorates, combined with graduate and post-graduate courses open to students from all over the world justify the magnitude of this mobility. It is an important center for cultural, scientific and technological development, with strong regional, national and international ties, offering students the opportunity to explore various careers as they gain transferable skills. The scientific groundwork of the University of Algarve is developed around four main areas (sea, health, food and well-being, arts and heritage and tourism) that aggregate all research work aiming that innovative ideas can be turned into products contributing to the economy of Portugal and the region. Among its faculty and alumni activities, the University of Algarve has well-established research centers in several fields such as molecular and structural biomedicine; marine sciences; electronics, optoelectronics and telecommunications, arts and communication; spatial and organisational dynamics; marine and environmental; and chemistry. The University of Algarve has consolidated the link established with regional business and public and private organizations, encouraging the transfer of knowledge and contributing to sustainable development with an impact across the community.

Cultural and sports activities 
The Student Union of the University of Algarve (Associação Académica da Universidade do Algarve, AAUAlg) is a centralized representative body of the students, founded on 1 October 1997. Before then there were six independent smaller student associations at the university representing each school or college of the University of Algarve. Sports activities are under the auspices of the students' union in collaboration with the university and the Student Support and Welfare Services. UAlg students run a university radio station as well as a theatrical troupe. The Students Union Sports Department promotes sports activities from salsa to hip-hop, from tai chi and yoga to bujinkan, from basketball to football. Sports Department of the Student Union activities such as canoeing, windsurfing and sailing are free of charge for UAlg students at the Nautical Sports Centre at Faro Island (Centro Náutico da Ilha de Faro). Competitive sports include handball, women’s futsal, women and men’s volleyball and men’s rugby. Federated teams (district championships) are active in men and women’s basketball, futsal and football. The AAUAlg has also a competitive esports department.

The Student Union also organises:
  the Semana Académica (Student Academic Week) in May;
  the Sports Festival in September, in the streets of downtown Faro, with exhibitions and workshops on sports activities;
  the Snow Campus, a winter event for skiing and snowboarding;
  the Sports Exchange Programme, with national and international teams;
  the Academic University Sports Federation tournaments, such as the Open Tennis, Volleyball and Beach Rugby tournaments; the Non-Federated National University Championships;
  the University Student Union Mini Half-Marathon.

Portimão branch
The Portimão branch of UAlg, 70 km to the west of Faro's UAlg headquarters, awards degrees in business management and tourism as well as technical specialization courses in accountancy and post-graduation in real estate appraisal & management.

See also 
List of universities in Portugal
Higher education in Portugal

External links 
University of Algarve (Official)
Facebook Universidade do Algarve - Página oficial

References 

University of Algarve
Educational institutions established in 1979
1979 establishments in Portugal
Faro, Portugal
Buildings and structures in Faro District